Martin Feuerstein (after 1914, Martin Ritter von Feuerstein; 6 January 1856, Barr - 13 February 1931, Munich) was a German painter and art teacher. He was a late adherent of the Nazarene movement, but was also heavily influenced by impressionism and Art Nouveau.

Life 
His father, Johann Martin Feuerstein, was a sculptor. By 1870, he was studying in Munich. He moved to Paris in 1878 for further studies with Luc-Olivier Merson, then worked as a painter of genre scenes in Alsace from 1880 to 1882. The following year, he took a study trip to Italy. His experiences there inspired him to devote himself to religious art when he returned to Munich. From 1898 to 1924, he was the Professor of Religious Painting at the Academy of Fine Arts; the last person to hold that chair. Among his best-known students were Theodor Baierl, Joseph Ehrismann, the church painter  and Leo Götz.

In 1914, he was knighted by King Ludwig III of Bavaria. His work can be found in churches throughout Germany and Alsace, as well as in the German Chapel at the Basilica of Saint Anthony of Padua.

References

Further reading 
 Feuerstein, Martin Ritter von. In: Allgemeines Künstlerlexikon. Die Bildenden Künstler aller Zeiten und Völker. Vol.39, Munich (2004) , Pg.268

External links 

 Paintings by Feuerstein in the Parish Church of the Virgin Mary, Riezlern

1856 births
1931 deaths
People from Barr, Bas-Rhin
Religious artists
Academic staff of the Academy of Fine Arts, Munich
19th-century German painters
19th-century German male artists
German male painters
20th-century German painters
20th-century German male artists
Painters from Alsace